Afrasura is a genus of moths in the subfamily Arctiinae from the Afrotropics.

Species
Afrasura aetheria Durante, 2012
Afrasura amaniensis 	(Cieslak & Häuser, 2006)
Afrasura camilla 	Durante, 2012
Afrasura clara 	(Holland, 1893)
Afrasura crenulata 	(Bethune-Baker, 1911)
Afrasura discocellularis 	(Strand, 1912)
Afrasura discreta 	Durante, 2009
Afrasura dubitabilis 	Durante, 2009
Afrasura duplex 	Durante, 2012
Afrasura emma 	Durante, 2009
Afrasura fracta 	Durante, 2012
Afrasura hieroglyphica (Bethune-Baker, 1911)
Afrasura hyporhoda 	(Hampson, 1900)
Afrasura ichorina 	(Butler, 1877)
Afrasura indecisa 	(Walker, 1869)
Afrasura neavi 	(Hampson, 1914)
Afrasura numida 	(Holland, 1893)
Afrasura obliterata 	(Walker, 1864)
Afrasura pallescens 	Durante, 2009
Afrasura peripherica 	(Strand, 1912)
Afrasura rivulosa 	(Walker, 1854)
Afrasura submarmorata 	(Kiriakoff, 1958)
Afrasura terlinea 	Durante, 2009
Afrasura trunca 	Durante, 2012
Afrasura violacea 	(Cieslak & Häuser, 2006)

References
Durante, A. 2009b. Revision of the Afrotropical species of Asura Walker, 1854 (Lepidoptera: Arctiidae, Lithosiinae), with the description of a new genus. - Zootaxa 2280:27–52.
afromoths

 
Arctiinae
Moth genera